Kent Moran is an American actor/filmmaker best known for his roles in Listen to Your Heart and The Challenger.

Personal life
Moran was born on June 12, 1982, in New York City and raised in Greenwich, Connecticut, with his younger brother Luke and older brothers, Clay and Fred. Kent is an alumnus of Rye Country Day School and Lehigh University, and currently resides in Los Angeles. His younger brother, Luke Moran, is also an actor.

Career
After college, Moran moved to New York City to pursue acting and music. For the year that Moran was in New York, he was one of the lead singers of an R&B group as well as a singer/songwriter. Moran's first principal role in a movie came as a football player in Julie Taymor's Across the Universe. He then was cast as James Dean in Guy Guido's documentary Icons. After doing several commercials, short films, and a small role on As the World Turns, Moran moved to Los Angeles.

In Los Angeles, Moran studied under numerous acting coaches, including Suzanne Kent, founder of the Groundlings. Moran was cast as James Dean twice more: once in an Armstrong Flooring advertising campaign, which is featured on The Ads of the World website, and again in a European Mercedes GLK commercial cast by Vickie Thomas. Moran also landed another small role on The Bold and the Beautiful.
In 2008, after the writer's strike, Moran started Wishing Well Pictures, an independent film production company. Soon after, he wrote Listen to Your Heart, which became Wishing Well Pictures' debut film. It was also Moran's debut starring role in a movie and his first time as a producer and second unit director. Moran also wrote the original music and score for the movie which can be found on the soundtrack. Listen to Your Heart became one of the first movies ever to screen outside in the middle of Times Square as part of the New York City International Film Festival, where Moran was nominated for Best Actor. Listen to Your Heart went on to win 15 awards at film festivals across the country and was distributed through Warner Brothers, Gravitas Ventures, and Vision Films.

Moran wrote and directed several short films in between his features. In 2011, Moran was cast in one of the lead roles in Regret, a psychological thriller shot in Portugal. In 2012, Kent wrote and starred in his directorial debut, The Challenger, where he stars opposite Michael Clarke Duncan, S. Epatha Merkerson, and Justin Hartley. The Challenger was Duncan's final on-screen role. It won several awards at top film festivals across the country and secured a direct deal with Regal Cinemas for a US Theatrical Release. The Challenger comes in out in US theaters on September 11, 2015. As an actor, Kent also had a cameo roles in the movie Contest in 2013 and the popular web series Keith Broke His Leg in 2015. He co-produced the festival favorite My Name Is David and released an EP of original songs entitled Better Left Said in 2014. Kent continues to act while developing projects under the Wishing Well Pictures label.

Filmography

Awards

References

External links 

 
 Kent Moran – Official Site
 Armstrong Flooring Advertising Campaign
Kent Moran Official Twitter
 European GLK Mercedes Commercial
 Gravitas Ventures
 Osiris Entertainment – Listen to Your Heart

Living people
Male actors from Connecticut
American male film actors
Lehigh University alumni
1982 births